Bandırma Gulf is a gulf on the Anatolian side of the Marmara Sea in Turkey. It is administratively a part of Bandırma ilçe (district) of Balıkesir Province.

Belkıs Tombolo (connecting the Kapıdağ Peninsula to the Anatolia mainland) is to the west, the Kapıdağ Peninsula is to the north and the Marmara coast of Anatolia is to the south. The Mola group of islands is to the northwest of the gulf. The main settlement of the bay is Bandırma, an industrial city and a  port .

The two main ferry services in the gulf are from Bandırma to Tekirdağ in the Thracean (European) part of Turkey and to Bostancı (Yenikapı) in the Anatolian part of İstanbul.

References

Landforms of Balıkesir Province
Bandırma
Gulfs of Turkey